Phassus marcius is a moth of the family Hepialidae first described by Herbert Druce in 1892. It is known from Mexico.

References

Moths described in 1892
Hepialidae